The 2019 Scheldeprijs was the 107th edition of the Scheldeprijs road cycling one day race, held on 10 April 2019 as part of the 2019 UCI Europe Tour, as a 1.HC categorised race.

Teams
Twenty-one teams were invited to start the race. These included ten UCI WorldTeams and eleven UCI Professional Continental teams.

Result

References

2019 UCI Europe Tour
2019
2019 in Belgian sport